= Las Tejas =

Coordinates: 28°43′S 65°46′W

- Municipality and village
- Interactive map of Las Tejas
- Country: Argentina
- Province: Catamarca Province
- Time zone: UTC−3 (ART)

Las Tejas is a village and municipality in Catamarca Province in northwestern Argentina.
